Dellemont–Wemple Farm is a historic farm complex located at Rotterdam in Schenectady County, New York. The complex consists of the farmhouse, Dutch barn, chicken house, and family cemetery.  The brick, gambrel roofed Dutch style farmhouse was built about 1790 and sits on a stone foundation.  The wood Dutch barn was built about 1770, or earlier.

It was added to the National Register of Historic Places in 1973.

References

External links
Dutch Barn Preservation Society Newsletter, Spring 1994, Vol. 7, Issue 1: The Dellemont/Wemple Barn, by Mark Hesler

Houses completed in 1790
Farms on the National Register of Historic Places in New York (state)
Buildings and structures in Schenectady County, New York
National Register of Historic Places in Schenectady County, New York